The United States Army raised a large number of tank destroyer units during World War II.

For most of the war US Army doctrine called for tank destroyers to primarily operate as concentrated tank destroyer battalions during combat. These battalions were to be concentrated in regiment-sized groups and brigades when needed to combat large forces of enemy tanks. However, combat experience in North Africa and Europe demonstrated that units larger than battalions were not needed. Tank destroyers were usually parcelled out to other units, and were rarely concentrated in battalions. The thirteen tank destroyer group headquarters dispatched to Europe never led massed units of tank destroyers, and nor did the 1st Tank Destroyer Brigade.

Brigades
Two tank destroyer brigades were formed in November 1942. The initial role of these units was to oversee the training of the large number of tank destroyer battalions that had been previously formed. The 1st Tank Destroyer Brigade was dispatched to Europe in January 1944 and the 2nd Tank Destroyer Brigade was disbanded in the United States during March that year. In August and September 1944 the 1st Tank Destroyer Brigade commanded the ad-hoc Task Force A which was tasked with seizing ports in Brittany. Its staff subsequently served as advisers in the headquarters of the Third Army.
1st Tank Destroyer Brigade
2nd Tank Destroyer Brigade

Groups

Twenty four tank destroyer groups were formed. US Army doctrine called for at least one tank destroyer group to be attached to each corps and army. In practice, tank destroyer battalions were usually attached directly to infantry divisions and there was no need for the group headquarters to command them. The tank destroyer group headquarters which were dispatched overseas were often used as advisers to corps headquarters to provide advice on anti-tank issues, or for other purposes, such as traffic management and controlling units in rear areas. Group headquarters only occasionally undertook combat missions.

Battalions
 Each tank destroyer battalion was assigned 36 self-propelled or towed anti-tank guns. They also included reconnaissance and anti-aircraft elements. From a high of 220 battalions, the number was reduced in April 1943 to 106 because of concerns over the value of the tank destroyer concept and competing demands for manpower. In late 1943, the War Department received permission to inactivate twenty-five tank destroyer battalions.

The personnel from inactivating battalions were either assigned to existing tank destroyer battalions still in training, or to other types of units. Beginning in 1944, they were also assigned to nine non-divisional infantry regiments or the Replacement and School Command for retraining as infantry replacements. whereupon they were assigned to understrength infantry divisions still stateside, or were sent overseas as individual replacements.

Eleven tank destroyer battalions, one of which was overseas, were converted en bloc to other types of units that were more in demand, such as chemical, tank, armored field artillery or amphibian tractor units.

Campaign credit key

600s

700s

800s

Training units

A number of units responsible for tank destroyer doctrine development and training were also established. They included:
Tank Destroyer Center (originally formed as the Tank Destroyer Command)
Tank Destroyer Board
Tank Destroyer School
Tank Destroyer Unit Training Center
Tank Destroyer Training Brigade
Tank Destroyer Replacement Training Center
Tank Destroyer Basic Unit Training Center

See also
List of armored and cavalry regiments of the United States Army

References
Citations

Works consulted

Tank destroyer units and formations
Lists of United States Army units and formations